Ralphy Rodríguez (born April 17, 1973 in Carolina, Puerto Rico) is a singer/songwriter, musician, producer, and former member of Menudo. He replaced Charlie Massó.

He joined Menudo in September of 1986, at a time that the group's worldwide fame was still strong, although it had begun to wane. He was popular among Menudo fans, and was a member of a Menudo line-up that included Ricky Martin, Raymond Acevedo, Sergio Blass, Ruben Gomez and Robi Rosa. He sang the songs "Cuando Seas Grande" and "Y Te Veré (A Las Tres)" featured on the Spanish album Somos Los Hijos del Rock as well as “Come back to me” and “Sa Bawat Halik” from the English album “In Action” released in the Philippines. 

In 1991, Edgardo Diaz (the band’s founder) was accused by ex members of Menudo of physical and sexual abuse towards Menudo members in various interviews. In a May 1991 Univision Television Program Cristina Show, with Rodriguez and his dad present as main accusers, Diaz refuted the allegations. Diaz has been the target of several sexual crime allegations by former Menudo members. Roy Rossello accused him of sexual abuse during a Brazilian reality show's transmission on October 21, 2014. 

Rodríguez became a born-again Christian in 1995, and released 3 Christian Inspirational CD’s between 1998-2008. In 1998 he released the Independent Album “Ralphy - El pie del mundo”, then released two albums with the Christian Label Canzion, “Ralphy - Quiero” in 2001 and “Ralphy Rodriguez - Voy a Tí” in 2008, which features a duet with Marcos Witt “Volví a vivir”, written by Juan Pablo Manzanero. He’s a Latin Grammy recipient as one of the vocalists on Marcos Witt’s 2004 award winning album “Recordando Otra Vez”, where he sang lead vocal on the classic “Peña de Horeb” as well as background vocals on the album.  

After various years away from music to focus on raising a family with his wife, he made his return to music in 2017. He is co-founder, lead vocalist and bass player for the international pop-rock band “2080 VEINTE/OCHENTA”. The band released their first single “Lo haré por ti” on August 31, 2020. 

Ralphy Rodriguez took part of the HBO Max Documentary "Menudo: Forever Young" alongside 12 other former Menudo members who shared their real life experiences within the iconic boyband. This 4 part mini-series was released on June 23rd, 2022.

Discography

With Menudo 
 Somos Los Hijos del Rock (1987)
 In Action (1987)

Solo 
 El pie del mundo (1998)
 Quiero (2001)
 Voy a Ti (2008)

References

 

1973 births
Living people
Menudo (band) members
People from Carolina, Puerto Rico